María José Alondra Rojas Pino (born 17 December 1987), informally known as Cote Rojas, is a Chilean professional footballer and is one of the top figures and one of the most outstanding players of the Chile women's national team. Rojas a 13-year veteran of the La Roja, remains one of the highest scoring strikers with 11 international goals in 44 international games.

Rojas was the first female player to be contracted internationally, paving the way for the likes of Tianne Endler and Yanara Aedo and many others of her national team to follow. Rojas has an impressive professional playing resume that has thus far spanned 4 continents and 6 countries. Her time in countries such as Germany, the United States, Japan, Lithuania, Czech Republic and Australia has enabled her to diversify her game and develop a rare global football experience. Her continual improvement and ability is supported by a large contingent of goals which has consistently proven her calibre, where she has made a name for herself as 'the Chilean international star' known for her ability to score goals. Her abilities and style have been both described as and compared to with her professional male national team players 'Alex Sanchez' and 'Vidal Arturo' "Cote Rojas has impetus of Arturo, the technique the wonder child and the grip of the Pitbull".

Rojas is a 13-year veteran for Chile National team (La Roja) and remains one of the highest scoring strikers for the La Roja with 11 international goals in 44 international games. The Fifa. Com player card overviewed Rojas as "Rojas brings character, experience and a goalscoring threat to the Roja set-up. One of the country's leading players, she is a forward who likes to drop wide to use her pace, while her other assets include a fine touch and dribbling skills. She has played in five continents and scored the goal that give Chile victory against Uruguay at the 2018 Copa America, their first in the competition and one that kept them in contention for a place at France 2019".

Rojas career not only includes playing in the 2019 women's world cup, but also in the Champions League. Rojas played with Gintra SK in 2018 and was part of the Slava Praga 2019 Champions League campaign.

Together with her diverse football experiences and talent, Rojas is accustomed to performing under pressure. Rojas has two championships within her professional clubs. Rojas scored the winning goal for the UTSA Roadrunners to win their first ever championship in the US and she is currently a high scoring impact player for the Santiago Morning. Rojas helped the Santiago Morning obtain their second championship in 2019 where she plated in the second part of the season scoring 6 goals in 5 games. The Santiago Morning also represented Chile in the 2019 Copa Libertoradores in Ecuador, reaching the quarter finals playing 3 games. Maria Jose Rojas scored a hat trick in game 3 of their Copa Libertadores campaign.

Additionally Rojas has made her mark in Australia playing and scoring with Canberra United in the W- League as well as being awarded the prestigious distinguished talent visa by the Australian Government to play and develop football in Australia. Rojas is regarded as an ambassador for young players craving to be on the world stage.

Rojas is currently contracted to Australian A-League Women club Melbourne City.

Rojas is fighter for women's rights and she continually demonstrates leadership in this field by supporting other players and speaking to the media about issues which affect the women's game.

Club career
Rojas has played Division 1 competitions in Chile (Priera Division and Copa Libertadores), Germany (Bundesliga), United States (W- League), Lithuania (A Lyga and Champions League), Japan (J2 League) and currently Australia (W- League and WNPL).

In 2019 Cote Rojas played as a forward for SK Slavia Praha (women) in the Czech First Division (women) and with the Santiago Morning in the Chilean first Division and in the Copa Libertadores in 2019.

The Santiago Morning are the two-time champions in 2018 and 2019 in the Chilean premier division.

Rojas signed with Canberra United for the 2018-19 W-League season.

Rojas has also played two seasons in the South Australian WNPL, scoring 65 goals in both the 2016 and 2017 seasons, as well as winning two golden boots for those seasons. More historically, Rojas accumulated nine goals at Copa Bicentenario in 2010 with Chile national team and in 2008 she scored 63 goals in 23 matches with her club Universidad de Chile, becoming the Goalscorer of the Year.

In 2020, Rojas played for Salisbury Inter in the 2020 Women's NPL (WNPL), scoring 27 goals in 18 matches and winning the Shirley Brown Medal as the WNPL Player of the Year. At the end of the year, she returned to the W-League, signing with Adelaide United.

In September 2021, Rojas joined Sydney FC.

In August 2022, she joined Cypriot club Apollon Ladies.

In November 2022,  Rojas returned to Australia, joining Melbourne City as an injury replacement for Hannah Wilkinson for two months.

International career
Rojas scored two goals at the 2018 Copa América Femenina, where Chile qualified to a FIFA Women's World Cup for the first time in its history.

Rojas was listed as the 'Player to Watch' for the La Roja in the 2019 Women's World Cup as she was the highest scoring player in the Chile squad wand as Letelier's most dangerous weapon up front.

International goals
Scores and results list Chile's goal tally first

References 

1987 births
Living people
Footballers from Santiago
Chilean women's footballers
Women's association football forwards
Universidad de Chile footballers
UTSA Roadrunners women's soccer players
Gintra Universitetas players
Orca Kamogawa FC players
Canberra United FC players
SK Slavia Praha (women) players
Santiago Morning (women) footballers
Adelaide United FC (A-League Women) players
Sydney FC (A-League Women) players
Apollon Ladies F.C. players
Melbourne City FC (A-League Women) players
Women's Premier Soccer League players
Frauen-Bundesliga players
Nadeshiko League players
A-League Women players
Czech Women's First League players
Chile women's international footballers
2019 FIFA Women's World Cup players
Footballers at the 2011 Pan American Games
Pan American Games competitors for Chile
Competitors at the 2014 South American Games
South American Games silver medalists for Chile
South American Games medalists in football
Chilean expatriate women's footballers
Chilean expatriate sportspeople in the United States
Expatriate women's soccer players in the United States
Chilean expatriate sportspeople in Germany
Expatriate women's footballers in Germany
Chilean expatriate sportspeople in Australia
Expatriate women's soccer players in Australia
Chilean expatriate sportspeople in Lithuania
Expatriate women's footballers in Lithuania
Chilean expatriate sportspeople in Japan
Expatriate women's footballers in Japan
Chilean expatriate sportspeople in the Czech Republic
Expatriate women's footballers in the Czech Republic
Chilean expatriate sportspeople in Cyprus
Expatriate women's footballers in Cyprus
LGBT association football players
Chilean LGBT sportspeople
University of Texas at San Antonio alumni